Chen Ti and Peng Hsien-yin were the defending champions, but lost in the final.

Pruchya Isaro and Nuttanon Kadchapanan won the title, beating defending champions Chen Ti and Peng Hsien-yin 6–4, 6–4.

Seeds

Draw

Draw

References
 Main Draw

Doubles
Chang-Sat Bangkok Open - Doubles
 in Thai tennis